The Anglican St Mary's Church at Luxborough within the English county of Somerset dates from the 13th century. It is a Grade II listed building.

The chancel of the church was built in the 13th century. In the 15th century the lower stages of the tower were added. A Victorian restoration in 1861 added the north aisle and added the upper part of the three-stage tower. Further restoration was undertaken in the 1970s.

It has been scheduled as an ancient monument. There are also several unidentified chest tombs.

The parish is part of the Exmoor benefice within the archdeaconry of Taunton.

See also
 List of ecclesiastical parishes in the Diocese of Bath and Wells

References

Scheduled monuments in West Somerset
Grade II listed buildings in West Somerset
Grade II listed churches in Somerset